Luther is a British psychological crime drama television series that premiered on BBC One in the UK on 4 May 2010. The series centres on DCI John Luther (played by Idris Elba), a highly talented detective working in London to solve a series of high-profile murders. Co-stars include Ruth Wilson as Alice Morgan, Warren Brown as DS Justin Ripley, Steven Mackintosh as DCI Ian Reed, and Saskia Reeves as Det Supt Rose Teller. As the series progresses Nikki Amuka-Bird joins as the recently promoted DCI Erin Gray, and Dermot Crowley is promoted to a starring role as Det Supt Martin Schenk, and Michael Smiley continues portraying Benny Silver. Patrick Malahide appears as George Cornelius in the fourth and fifth series.

 A sequel film, Luther: The Fallen Sun, aired on 24 February 2023.

Series overview

Episodes

Series 1 (2010)
The first series tells a single crime story each episode for the first four episodes, and then ends with a two-part story, with other narrative elements developing across the series.

Series 2 (2011)
The second series consists of two two-part stories.

Series 3 (2013)
Series 3 follows the structure of series 2, consisting of two two-part stories.

Series 4 (2015)
Series 4 consists of one two-part story.

Series 5 (2019)
Series 5 consists of a single, serialized narrative over four episodes.

Film (2023)
A feature film sequel, Luther: The Fallen Sun, was released in select cinemas on 24 February 2023, before its streaming release on 10 March 2023, by Netflix.

Ratings

Special

References

Lists of crime television series episodes
Episodes